The 1997 Wales rugby union tour of USA and Canada was a series of matches played in July 1997 in USA and Canada by Wales national rugby union team, while the best Welsh players where involved in the 1997 British and Irish Lions tour to South Africa.

Results
Scores and results list Wales's points tally first.

References 

1997 rugby union tours
tour
1997 in Canadian rugby union
1997 in North American rugby union
rugby union
1997
1997
1997
1997 in American rugby union